The Czech Republic has been a member state of the European Union since the 2004 enlargement of the European Union. It is not a member of the eurozone.

See also 
Czech Republic and the euro
2003 Czech European Union membership referendum
2004 European Parliament election in the Czech Republic
2009 European Parliament election in the Czech Republic 
2009 Czech Presidency of the Council of the European Union
2014 European Parliament election in the Czech Republic
2019 European Parliament election in the Czech Republic
2022 Czech Presidency of the Council of the European Union

References 

Czech Republic and the European Union
History of the European Union
Enlargement of the European Union